Dagmar Navrátilová (born 18 July 1966) is a Czech politician. She was elected to the Chamber of Deputies in the 2010 election, representing Public Affairs (VV), but broke away with party leader Karolína Peake and five other politicians to form a new party. The new party founded after breaking away from VV was named LIDEM, which means "for the people" in Czech, and is also based on the first letters of "Liberal Democrats".

References 

1966 births
Living people
Politicians from Olomouc
Members of the Chamber of Deputies of the Czech Republic (2010–2013)
Public Affairs (political party) politicians
Palacký University Olomouc alumni
21st-century Czech women politicians